Gastrotheca rebeccae (common name: Rebecca's marsupial frog) is a species of frog in the family Hemiphractidae. It is endemic to Peru and known from the eastern slopes of the Cordillera Oriental in the Ayacucho Region, at elevations of  asl. The specific name honours Dr. Rebecca Pyles from the East Tennessee State University.

Natural habitat of Gastrotheca rebeccae is cloud forest. Possible threats to this species are unknown.

References

rebeccae
Amphibians of the Andes
Amphibians of Peru
Endemic fauna of Peru
Taxonomy articles created by Polbot
Amphibians described in 1988